Kauppi is a Finnish surname. Notable people with the surname include:

Emil Kauppi (1865–1930), Finnish composer
Kalle Kauppi (1892–1961), Finnish legal scholar and politician
Waino Kauppi (1898-1932), musician
Raili Kauppi (1920–1995), Finnish philosopher
Ossi Kauppi (1929–2000), Finnish ice hockey player
Kirsti Kauppi (born 1957), Finnish diplomat
Lo Kauppi (born 1970), Swedish film and theater actress
Piia-Noora Kauppi (born 1975), Finnish politician
Minna Kauppi (born 1982), Finnish orienteer
Kalle Kauppi (born 1992), Finnish footballer
Mauno Kauppi (born 1927), Hall of Fame Canadian-Finnish hockey player 1943-1954

See also
Kuappi

Finnish-language surnames